"ADHD" is a 2006 single by Blood Red Shoes, and was the first to feature an accompanying video featuring the band. Both the A-side and the B-side tracks continued to be played live by the band as late as 2008. As with their previous singles, the release was a limited edition vinyl only. "ADHD" was regularly used by the band to close their live shows, becoming a common encore song due to calls from the audience.

Drowned in Sound rated the single 9/10, describing it as "one of the brashest and best singles of two-zero-zero-six thus far", while musicOMH called it "a marvellous bloody, pop punk death frenzy".

Track listing

7" 
 "ADHD"
 "Can't Find The Door"

References

2006 singles
2006 songs